Joseph Heller, transcribed also as Yosef Heller  (born  January 6, 1937, Tel Aviv) is an Israeli historian.  He is Professor Emeritus at the Hebrew University in Jerusalem.

Published works
The Birth of Israel, 1945–1949: Ben-Gurion and his critics, (2000), University of Florida Press,  
The Stern Gang: ideology, politics, and terror, 1940–1949 (1995)
British Policy towards the Ottoman Empire, 1908–1914 (1983) 
 The Struggle for the Jewish State: Zionist Politics, 1936—1948, The Zalman Shazar Center For The Furtherance Of The Study Of Jewish History, Jerusalem, 1984. (Be-maʼavaḳ la-medinah. Yerushalayim : Merkaz Zalman Shazar le-haʻamaḳat ha-todaʻah ha-hisṭorit ha-Yehudit, 1984) 560 pages. A Collection of documents by various authors, in Hebrew.    and 
 The United States, the Soviet Union and the Arab-Israeli conflict, 1948–67 Superpower rivalry, Manchester University Press, 2016. 304 pages. The Cold War context, based on extensive analysis of rare documents. 
https://manchesteruniversitypress.co.uk/81526103826/

References

1937 births
Living people
Israeli historians
Academic staff of the Hebrew University of Jerusalem